Double, Double (also published as The Case of the Seven Murders) is a novel that was published in 1949 by Ellery Queen.  It is a mystery novel set in the imaginary New England town of Wrightsville, US.

Plot summary
Ellery Queen investigates a series of murders that seem to be related by an old rhyme: "Rich man, poor man, beggar man, thief, ...."

Literary significance and criticism 
"The last full-fledged Wrightsville novel is as usual strong on characterizations.  But some of the deductions made from the clues seem more speculative than logical."

Footnotes

External links 
"Ellery Queen is the American detective story."

1950 American novels
Novels by Ellery Queen
Little, Brown and Company books